Oríkì, or praise poetry, is a cultural phenomenon amongst Yoruba-speakers of West Africa.

Characteristics 
Oríkì includes both single praise names  and long strings of “attributive epithets” that may be chanted in poetic form. According to the Yoruba historian  Samuel Johnson, oriki expresses what a child is or what he or she is hoped to become. If one is male, a praise name is usually expressive of something heroic, brave or strong. If one is female, the praise name may be a term of endearment. In either case, the Reverend Johnson said that it was intended to have a stimulating effect on its bearer.

Because of the variety of performance modes, oríkì defies classification as music or poetry, and it has been studied from both perspectives. Historically, oríkì was delivered by a specialist in a particular vocal style. For example, ìjálá is acoustically open and intense, while ewì is spoken in a high-falsetto, wailing voice quality.  According to Waterman, “The words that placate gods and drive kings to suicide [are] made more potent by the patterning of timbre, texture, pitch, and rhythm.”  According to Vidal, Yorùbás have oríkì for “almost everything . . . even food”. 

The oríkì varies in length depending on whether it is the name given to a child to describe the future portents of the life or a recital of the accomplishments of a person's clan. It is invoked to praise a child for bringing pride to the parents or to attempt to evoke virtuous character traits of bravery, fortitude and perseverance that are believed to be innate in a person by pedigree. 

It is not always clear what was pre-eminent in the mind of the person who named a child with the shorter praise name. Predetermined names based on the circumstances of birth are called Oríkì ṣókí, such as the names for twins: Táiyé and Kẹ́hìndé. Traditionally, a boy born with the umbilical cord around his neck is called Òjó (there are exceptions; the Ijebu subculture names a boy or girl Àìná), but the name Òjó has praise poetry that does not even mention that but implies that the child would be the darling of ladies and might be a little impatient.

Praising gods and mortals has traditionally been the focus for singers and the most engaging for audiences, whether the tone is persuasive or controversial. Nigerian politicians often hire well-known singers to elaborate on their heritage.  Today, Nigerian Christians and Muslims use oriki to praise sing for the Abrahamic god. They may pray for salvation if they hear the praise of indigenous Yorùbá gods such as Ògún because many of them believe that traditional Yorùbá deities are demonic.

Examples

Short form 
Examples of oríkì names and their meanings (F or M indicates whether the name is usually female or male):

 Àjoké (F) - meant to be taken care of by all
 Àlàké (F) - to take care of her as a result of victory over circumstance
 Ànìké (F) - had (birthed) to be pampered
 Àsàké (F) - selected to be spoiled (with good things)
 Àbèní (F) - begged for (from God or, more traditionally, the gods)
 Àríké (F) - meant to be spoiled on sight
 Àdùké (F) - people will fight over the privilege to spoil her
 Àdùnní (F) - competed over to have
 Àbèbí (F) - begged for to be birthed (probably a difficult birth)
 Àjàní (M) - fought to have this child, valuable and cherished son
 Àkànní (M) - met only once to have this child
 Àjàgbé (M) - fought to carry this child 
 Àkànde Àgàn (M) - favourite of the prince
 Àdìgún (M) - the perfect one 
 Àpèkẹ́ (F) - Called to be cared for
 Adunni (F) - One sweet to have
 Amoke (F) - Known about and cared for
 Ajadi (M) - the end of conflict
 Ariyo (M) - One that brings joy on sight
 Àshàbi (F) - selected to be born
 Àtànda (M) - lured to be created
 Ayoka (F) - One who causes joy
 Atunke (F) - One who would continually be taken care of

Long form 
Usually, a family derives its surname from a strong, accomplished patriarch or matriarch, and it is common to find the latter's accomplishments recited in the longer version of the oríkì of all progeny. An excerpt from praise poetry for the name Òjó would be: 

Another particularly fine example of an excerpt from a family's oriki is that of the Supreme Court justice Kayode Eso:

 

This excerpt highlights Justice Eso's descent from the famous Eso Ikoyi warriors of the medieval period.

See also
Isibongo, a similar concept amongst the Zulu of South Africa.

Notes

References

External links
Isiri: Inspiration in Yoruba Language
Oriki Radio, Oríkì, Last.fm

Yoruba culture
Poetic forms
African poetry
Panegyrics